Philippe Dominati (born 12 April 1954) is a French politician and a member of the Senate of France. He represents Paris and is a member of The Republicans Party.

References
Page on the Senate website

1954 births
Living people
French Senators of the Fifth Republic
The Republicans (France) politicians
Politicians from Paris
Union for a Popular Movement politicians
French people of Italian descent
Senators of Paris